Carver Lake is a lake in Ramsey and Washington counties, in the U.S. state of Minnesota.

Carver Lake was named for a pioneer who settled there.

See also
List of lakes in Minnesota

References

Lakes of Minnesota
Lakes of Ramsey County, Minnesota
Lakes of Washington County, Minnesota